Zekri (also Romanized as Z̄ekrī; also known as Kalāteh Z̄ekrī) is a village in Tabas-e Masina Rural District, Gazik District, Darmian County, South Khorasan Province, Iran. At the 2006 census, its population was 87, in 17 families.

References 

Populated places in Darmian County